The Japanese velvet dogfish (Scymnodon ichiharai) is a harmless deepwater sleeper shark of the family Somniosidae, found in the northwest Pacific from Suruga Bay and adjacent waters of Japan at depths of between .  Reproduction is ovoviviparous.

References

Scymnodon
Fish described in 1984